Heidi is a 1968 American made-for-TV film version of the 1880 novel of the same name by Johanna Spyri which debuted on November 17, 1968 on NBC. It starred actress Jennifer Edwards, stepdaughter of Julie Andrews and daughter of Blake Edwards, in the title role, alongside Maximilian Schell, Jean Simmons,  and Michael Redgrave.  The score was composed by John Williams. The film was sponsored by Timex.

Differences from the novel

The film altered the plot of the novel considerably, primarily by redefining the relationships of characters to one another. Heidi, instead of being the orphan of Grandfather's late son, becomes the orphan of the Grandfather's late daughter and her late husband; Dete becomes Heidi's aunt as the living but estranged daughter of the Grandfather. In addition, Heidi is further recast as Herr Sesemann's niece because of his late brother's marriage to Grandfather's late daughter. As Sesemann's niece, Heidi becomes cousin rather than simply companion to Clara, who early in the film is negatively portrayed as a hateful and spoiled child. By casting Simmons as Fräulein Rottenmeier, governess for both Heidi and Clara, the film remakes Rottenmeier as an extremely sympathetic character; she becomes almost a surrogate mother to Heidi. This drastic character transformation removes the antagonism between the two, thus removing the tension which dominates and enlivens the novel. So changed is Rottenmeier's personality that she falls in love with Sesemann, and he with her, a situation impossible in the novel.

The film also added a subplot in which Heidi's grandfather, a church organist in this version, has long been unable to play because of a family tragedy, which is shown to be his daughter's marriage to Sesemann's brother and her subsequent death. At the very end of the film, he regains his confidence, mounts the steps to the organ, and begins to play.

Another difference between the book and the film occurs during Clara's attempts at walking after Sesemann has accepted the Grandfather's invitation for Clara to visit Heidi in his home. In the novel, Sesemann's kindly and strong-willed mother teaches Heidi to read and to pray; she visits the girls on the Alp. Her character is cut completely from the film. In the novel, Peter becomes jealous of Heidi's attentions to Clara and deliberately destroys Clara's wheelchair so that the crippled girl will have to return home; the chain of events resulting from that destruction ends in Clara's taking her first successful steps on the Alp while leaning on Peter and Heidi. In the film, Fräulein Rottenmeier and Herr Sesemann visit the girls, and Grandfather deliberately leaves Clara alone on the mountains, knowing that she actually can walk but has been afraid to try. Clara struggles to get out of her wheelchair, knocking it over and falling down in the process. As she tries to get up, she sees her father, Herr Sesemann, looking at her encouragingly, and haltingly walks towards him. The film ends with a significant glance between Fraulein Rottenmeier and Herr Sesemann, a glance which promises a future for them together.

Cast
 Jennifer Edwards as Heidi
 Michael Redgrave as Grandfather
 Maximilian Schell as Richard Sessemann
 Jean Simmons as Frl. Rottenmeier
 Walter Slezak as Father Richter
 Peter van Eyck as Dr. Bernd Reboux
 Zuleika Robson as Klara
 John Moulder-Brown as (as John M. Brown)
 Karl Lieffen as Sebastian
 Elisabeth Neumann-Viertel as Grandmother (as Elisabeth Neumann)
 Miriam Spoerri as Aunt Dete

Production
The film was shot on location in the Swiss and German Alps, and Frankfurt.

Broadcast

On November 17, 1968, the film's premiere on NBC unexpectedly became one of the most notorious moments in American broadcasting because it interrupted the conclusion of a game between the American Football League's two top teams — the Oakland Raiders and New York Jets (see 1968 AFL season). NBC's network management had taken the decision to show the entire game until its completion even though it was contractually obligated to begin the broadcast of Heidi on the East Coast at 7:00 p.m. ET; the film's premiere would be delayed by the overrunning game. The number of East Coast viewers calling NBC asking for confirmation that the game would be shown to the end caused all 26 phone lines at NBC's switchboard to fuse.

Unfortunately the network management's decision was not conveyed to the NBC's control facility in New York. Consequently, Heidi began at 7:00 p.m. as scheduled, ending the East Coast broadcast of the Raiders-Jets game. Shortly afterward, Oakland scored two touchdowns within the final minute, winning the game 43–32 in a major upset. Despite decades passing, many East Coast sports fans have never forgiven NBC (or the network's president Julian Goodman) for the so-called Heidi Bowl.

Nevertheless, among non-football fans, the film was the highest viewed television program of the week, with a 31.8 rating and 47 share.

References

External links
 
 
 The movie "Heidi" on Internet Archive (please sign up for a free account): Link

1968 television films
1968 films
Heidi films
Films about orphans
Films directed by Delbert Mann
Films set in Switzerland
NBC network original films
Films scored by John Williams